Sipho Mchunu (born 1951, Kranskop, South Africa) is best known for his work in the band Juluka from the 1970s to the 1980s. 

Mchunu's compositions, vocals and guitar work brought Zulu folk styles such as maskanda and mbaqanga to a wider audience both in South Africa and internationally.

Along with his work with Juluka he has also released three solo maskanda albums.

Discography

Juluka

Studio albums

1979 Universal Men 
1981 African Litany 
1982 Ubuhle Bemvelo 
1982 Scatterlings 
1983 Work For All 
1984 Stand Your Ground (Juluka album)
1984 Musa Ukungilandela 
1984 The International Tracks 
1997 Crocodile Love (released in South Africa as Ya Vuka Inkunzi)

Live albums

1986 Juluka Live: The Good Hope Concerts
1992 South Africa 9: Johnny Clegg & Sipho Mchunu (Duo Juluka) + Ladysmith Black Mambazo: Cologne Zulu Festival (recorded 1977 & 1981)

Collections

1991 The Best of Juluka
1996 Putumayo Presents A Johnny Clegg & Juluka Collection

Solo albums

1989 Yithi Esavimba
1990 Umhlaba uzobuya
2021 Selula

References

1951 births
Living people
Anti-apartheid activists
South African musicians
Juluka members
Maskanda musicians